The World Heavyweight Championship was a professional wrestling world heavyweight championship sanctioned by a group of National Wrestling Alliance (NWA) promoters led by the NWA affiliate in Omaha, Nebraska, United States. These promoters chose to recognize Édouard Carpentier as NWA World Heavyweight Champion following his disputed win over NWA World Heavyweight Champion Lou Thesz on June 14, 1957. The majority of NWA promoters continued to recognize Thesz as their champion.

It was often contested alongside the AWA World Heavyweight Championship, and the two titles were finally unified when AWA champion Verne Gagne defeated Omaha champion Fritz Von Erich on September 7, 1963.

Title history

Footnotes

See also
List of early world heavyweight champions in professional wrestling

Notes

External links
Wrestling-Titles.com

World heavyweight wrestling championships
American Wrestling Association championships
Professional wrestling in Nebraska